The Flame of Love is a 1930 British drama film, that is a love story between Russian military officer and a Chinese actress. Directed by Richard Eichberg and Walter Summers it stars Anna May Wong and John Longden and has a running time of 74 minutes.  This film has also been released under the title Road to Dishonour.

It was made at Elstree Studios by British International Pictures. Separate French (Hai-Tang) and German-language versions (The Road to Dishonour) of the film were also made and released. The film's sets were designed by Clarence Elder, Willi Herrmann and Werner Schlichting.

Synopsis 
The Flame of Love is the story of a beautiful young Chinese actress who falls in love with a Russian military officer.  While performing one night, the Grand Duke sees Hai-Tang (Wong) on stage and immediately decides he must have her for himself.  The Grand Duke orders the officer Hai-Tang has fallen for (Boris) to bring her to his room, and after a night of drinking he tries to make love to Hai-Tang.  Her brother sees this unfolding and wounds the Grand Duke, resulting in him being punished by death.  Hai-Tang decides to give in to the Grand Dukes sexual temptation in return for her brothers freedom.  The Grand Duke accepts this offer but then learns of the love affair between Hai-Tang and his Lieutenant Boris.  After finding this out, the Grand Duke releases Hai-Tang from her bargain as long as she leave Russia and never see Boris again.

Cast 
 Anna May Wong as Hai Tang
 Georg H. Schnell as Grand Duke
 John Longden as Lieutenant Boris Boriskoff
 Percy Standing as Col. Moravjev
 Mona Goya as Yvette
 Fred Schwartz as Birnbaum
 Ley On as Wang Hu

See also 
Anna May Wong on film and television

References 
 
 
 

 

1930 films
1930s historical drama films
British historical drama films
1930s English-language films
Films directed by Richard Eichberg
Films directed by Walter Summers
British multilingual films
Films set in Russia
Films set in the 1900s
British black-and-white films
1930 multilingual films
1930 drama films
Films shot at British International Pictures Studios
1930s British films